Lewis Sanders (born June 22, 1978) is a former American football cornerback. He was drafted by the Cleveland Browns in the fourth round of the 2000 NFL Draft. He played college football at Maryland.

Sanders has also played for the Houston Texans, New England Patriots and Atlanta Falcons.

College career
He is only the fourth player in University of Maryland history to return 2 kickoff returns for touchdowns in a career, and he ranks sixth on the Terps’ career-record list with 956 yards on kickoff returns and seventh with 10 interceptions. In 1999, he was an All-America Third-team choice by SportsPage.com and The Sporting News, as well as an All-Atlantic Coast Conference First-team selection and a semi-finalist for the Jim Thorpe Award, given to the nation's top defensive back.

Professional career

Cleveland Browns
Sanders was drafted in the 2000 NFL Draft by the Cleveland Browns and played with the team through the 2004 season.

Houston Texans
He signed with the Houston Texans as a free agent in 2005 and played two years there.

Atlanta Falcons
On March 7, 2007, the Atlanta Falcons signed Sanders. He was released by the team following the season on February 15, 2008.

New England Patriots
On March 6, 2008, he signed with the New England Patriots.

References

External links
 New England Patriots bio (archive)

1978 births
Living people
Sportspeople from Staten Island
Players of American football from New York City
American football cornerbacks
Maryland Terrapins football players
Cleveland Browns players
Houston Texans players
Atlanta Falcons players
New England Patriots players
St. Peter's Boys High School alumni